Guptipara is a census town in Balagarh, a community development block that forms an administrative division in the Sadar subdivision of the Hooghly district in the Indian state of West Bengal.

Geography

Guptipara sits beside the Hooghly River that divides Guptipara into two parts (Panchayat I and II are situated in the western part and Panchayat III is situated on the eastern side). Two oxbow lakes, Dekol and Dhama, are situated at the northern and southern end of Guptipara, respectively. Before the 15th century, many parts of Guptipara sank and were covered by lakes and rivers.  The Dekol was connected with the Hooghly by the Muri Ganga channel, which can no longer be traced. During floods, water from the river enters through the Muri Ganga Path before it reunites with Dekol. An increase in population and farming, floods, the STKK road and railway lines define the landscape. The village is part of the Hooghly-Burdwan rice belt.

History
Guptipara is the home of Bengal's first "Barowari" Durga Puja which introduced Sri Bindhabasini Jagaddhatri Puja (Worshipping Devi Durga introduced by Lord Rama), with a club named Bindhyabasini. It is now known as Bindhyabasini Mata. In the 1760s, a group of men were stopped from taking part in the household Durga Puja of the ruling Sen family. In retaliation, seven of these men formed a committee and organised a modern club culture called "Barowari Puja." (In SanskritBar means Public or community and in Farsi  wari means By or for) Opinions vary about the year of commencement of the Barowari puja. Some believe it to be 1760 while others claim it to be 1790.

Guptipara was one of the main places in ancient India where the "Sanskrit Toles" and Pandith lived. "Pathmahal," "Raghu Nath" Mandir, and Mela were situated throughout Guptipara in large numbers. Many old manuscripts and books are preserved in the "Sisir Bani Mandir Pathagar", the government library.

Guptipara is the birthplace of folk singer Bhola Moira, and of Diwan Mohanlal, the Commander in Chief of King Siraj ud-Daulah.

The temple complex at Brindaban Chandra's Math houses four Vaishnava Temples: Chaitanya, Brindabanchandra, Ramchandra and Krishnachandra. The Ramchandra Temples contain many terracotta works, and the structures bear characteristics of the Bengal school of architecture, with carvings depicting scenes from the epics and Puranas.

Guptipara was a citadel of Vaishnavite culture. Even today, residents observe Ras, Dol and Ratha-Yatra, which is Guptipara's greatest festival. The Guptipara ratha, one of the tallest and oldest rathas in West Bengal, is said to cover the second-longest distance in India after that of Puri. On the day before the Ultorath (the homecoming of Lord Bridabanchandra), a festival known as "Bhandarloot" is held in Guptipara. Many people across Eastern India come gather there to pull the ropes of the ratha.

Guptipara is the home of the first branded Bengali "Gupo sandesh," a special kind of sweetmeat.

Demographics
As per the 2011 Census of India, the population was 2,169, of which 1,090 (50%) were males and 1,079 (50%) were females. 192 of the population was below age 6. The literacy rate was 83.92% of the population over age 6.

Transport
Guptipara can be reached from Kolkata or Howrah on the suburban train service. Local trains from Howrah, Katwa and Bandel stop at Guptipara railway station. Train service is also available from Sealdah.

Guptipara is connected by roadways, including the Assam (S.T.K.K.) Road.

Buses are available from district headquarters Chinsurah & Kalna (Kalna–Chinsurah 8 No. Private Bus), Burdwan (Guptipara–Burdwan) and Tarakeswar (Guptipara–Tarakeswar).

Ferry service to Guptipara is available from Shantipur and Tarapur.

Autorickshaw services are available from Jirat (Jirat–Guptipara) and from Kalna (Kalna–Guptipara).

Sports
The two main sports clubs are over one-hundred and twenty years old: The Gupitara Football Club and the Gupitara Premier League. The Guptipara Football Club, Aida Milani Sangha, and the Guptipara Cricket Association arrange regular tournaments. The Guptipara Premier League in cricket received some fame and came into the spotlight of Bengal Media. These clubs organize football tournaments at Guptipara.

Administration
Guptipara is divided into three administrative parts, or gram panchayats. Guptipara I covers areas like Guptipara Station Road, Satgachia, Bandhagachi, Pathmahal, Mirdanga, Tengripara, and Saradanagar villages. Guptipara II covers the largest area with Manasatala, Pathakpukur, Beldanga, Kumorpara, Chutorpara, Baburdanga, Aryanagar, Rathsadak, Jamtala, Behula, Ghoshpara, Sondolpur, Rampur, Aida, and Baire, as well as many other small villages. Guptipara III covers Fultala, Char-Krishnabati, Benali, Shaktipur etc.

Guptipara is under The Hooghly Lok Sabha and Balagarh Vidhan Sabha.

Heads of Administration
M.P.: Locket Chatterjee
MLA: Asim Majhi
Zilla Parishad: Paritosh Ghosh
Pradhan Guptipara -I: Padma Roy
Pradhan Guptipara -II: Sonali Ghosh
Pradhan Guptipara -III: Sanjib Mahato

Education

College
Saroj Mohan Institute of Technology

Higher Secondary schools
 Guptipara High School ( 1890, Near Guptipara police outpost, Bhattacharya Para. Co-ed) 
 Guptipara Girls High School (est. 1950, Hugli. Co-ed)

Secondary schools
 Satyabrata Balika Vidyalaya (Girls Only)
 Krishna Bati Char High School (Co-Ed)
 Satgachia High School (Co-Ed)
 Natagarh High School (Co-Ed)
 Sultanpur Alia Sr. Madarasah School (Co-Ed)
 Satgachia Balika Vidyalaya (Girls only)

Mission
 Hindu Mission Boys Welfare Home

Festivals and culture

Guptiparans celebrate several events: Ratha Yatra, Jagadhatri Puja, Durga Puja, Dol Yatra, Jhapan, Kali Puja and many local festivals, including Guptipara Rathayatra.

Ratha-Yatra

Ratha Yatra is the main attraction. At approximately 2 km, the Guptipara Ratha covers the second largest distance in India. It starts from the temple complex in Lord Brindaban Chandra Temple and stretches to Lord Gopal Temple at Borobazar, Guptipara. Approximately one million people gather there to celebrate the Ratha Yatra.

Jagaddhatri Puja
Barowari committees and houses organize Jagadhatri Puja. The main attraction is a firecracker competition and procession that takes place on the last evening of the Puja.

Durga Puja
Like other areas of Bengal, Guptipara hosts Durga Puja. Puja from the Sen's house is one of the oldest traditions in Bengal. The famous clubs who organize Durga Puja are United Club, Saradanagar New Young Star, Bandhagachi Barowari, Azad hind Club, SMIT, Jagarani Sangha, Durga Mandir, Nirbhik Sangha, Daspara Barowari, Bhumijpara Barowari, Swaralipi Club, Evergreen, Thakurpara Barowari,Aryanagar Barowari, and Sasthitala Barowari. At least 100 small and big pujas have been organized here.

Kali Puja
The main attractions are Desh Kali Puja & Mashal Kali Puja (Deceits Kali). Flares are often used in the procession of Mashal Kali Puja.

Food
Signature dishes include:

Famous Pitai Porota
Singara (Samosa)
Famous Nalen Gurer Sandesh
Kachuri
gupo sondes

References

Notes

External links

 Abhimunya Classes for Competitive Exams
 Travel Article on Guptipara
 Guptipara Ratha Yatra Photos
Ebar Guptipara

Villages in Hooghly district